Trillion Year Spree: The History of Science Fiction, commonly referred to as Trillion Year Spree, is a book by Brian W. Aldiss and David Wingrove published in 1986.

The book is an expanded version of Aldiss's 1973 Billion Year Spree: The True History of Science Fiction.

Reception
Dave Langford reviewed Trillion Year Spree for White Dwarf #84, and stated that "the new Spree is an essential reference and a good read."

References

Further reading
Review by Gary K. Wolfe (1986) in Fantasy Review, November 1986
Review by Dan Chow (1986) in Locus, #310 November 1986
Review by David V. Barrett (1987) in Vector 137
Review by Darrell Schweitzer (1987) in Aboriginal Science Fiction, May-June 1987
Review by Roz Kaveney (1987) in Foundation, #38 Winter 1986/87
Review by Veronica Hollinger (1988) in Science Fiction Studies, March 1988
Review by Paul J. McAuley (1989) in Interzone, #28 March-April 1989

Hugo Award for Best Non-Fiction Book winning works
Science fiction books